The Princess of All Lands is a collection of stories by American writer Russell Kirk.  It was released in 1979 and was the author's first book published by Arkham House.  It was published in an edition of 4,120 copies.  The story "There's a Long, Long Trail A-Winding" had won a World Fantasy Award in 1977.

Contents

The Princess of All Lands contains the following tales:

 "Prologue"
 "Sorworth Place"
 "Behind the Stumps"
 "The Princess of All Lands"
 "The Last God's Dream"
 "The Cellar of Little Egypt"
 "Ex Tenebris"
 "Balgrummo's Hell"
 "There's a Long, Long Trail A-Winding"
 "Saviourgate"

Sources

1979 short story collections
Fantasy short story collections
Horror short story collections
Arkham House books